Udea ochreocapitalis is a moth in the family Crambidae. It was described by Ragonot in 1894. It is found in the Russian Far East (Amur).

References

ochreocapitalis
Moths described in 1894